The Lone Star was a passenger vehicle in production between 1919 and 1922. It was made by the Lone Star Motor Truck and Tractor Association, San Antonio, Texas.

History 
The Lone Star  was available as the Beauty Four (Piedmont model 4-30) with a Lycoming engine or the Beauty Six (Piedmont Model 6-40) with a Continental engine. Both open and closed models were offered. The cars were manufactured for Lone Star by Piedmont Motor Car Company of Lynchburg, Virginia.

Advertisements listed the 4-30 model for sale at $1,545. Lone Star sales ended in 1922 when the Piedmont factory closed.

References

External links

Defunct motor vehicle manufacturers of the United States
Vintage vehicles
1920s cars
Motor vehicle manufacturers based in Texas
Vehicle manufacturing companies established in 1919
Vehicle manufacturing companies disestablished in 1922
Cars introduced in 1919